María del Carmen Leyte Coello (born 3 December 1953) is a Spanish doctor and politician of the People's Party (PP) who has been a member of the Senate of Spain since the 2008 general election, representing the Province of Ourense.

Political career
Leyte was born in Vigo and was the mayor of Cartelle between 1991 and 2017.

In addition to her role in parliament, Leyte has been serving as a member of the Spanish delegation to the Parliamentary Assembly of the Council of Europe since 2018. In the Assembly, she is a member of the Committee on Social Affairs, Health and Sustainable Development (since 2020), Sub-Committee on the Europe Prize (since 2020), Sub-Committee on Children (since 2020), the Sub-Committee on Public Health and Sustainable Development (since 2019) and Committee on Migration, Refugees and Displaced Persons (2018–2019). In this capacity, she authored a 2022 report on vaccine-preventable diseases.

Personal life
On 12 March 2020 during the ongoing coronavirus pandemic, Leyte tested positive for SARS-CoV-2.

References

1953 births
Living people
Members of the 9th Senate of Spain
Members of the 10th Senate of Spain
Members of the 11th Senate of Spain
Members of the 12th Senate of Spain
Members of the 13th Senate of Spain
Members of the 14th Senate of Spain
People's Party (Spain) politicians
Women mayors of places in Spain
Spanish women in politics
People from Vigo